Chosan is:

Chosan, a county in Chagang province, North Korea
Chōsan, a morning Dharma meeting in Zen Buddhism
Chosan-dong, a precinct of Sangju, South Korea

See also
Joseon (disambiguation), commonly misspelled as "Chosan"